Aleksandr Aleksandrovich Stepanov (born April 26, 1979) is a Russian ice hockey forward who currently plays for Severstal Cherepovets of the Kontinental Hockey League.

Honors
Russian championship:  2000, 2005, 2006
European Champions cup:  2006, 2007

References

External links

1979 births
Living people
Russian ice hockey right wingers
Ak Bars Kazan players
HC Dynamo Moscow players